oidentd is an RFC 1413 compliant ident daemon which runs on Linux, FreeBSD, OpenBSD, NetBSD, DragonFly BSD, and some versions of Darwin and Solaris. It can handle IP masqueraded or NAT connections, and has a flexible mechanism for specifying ident responses. Users can be granted permission to specify their own ident responses, hide responses for connections owned by them, or return random ident responses. Responses can be specified according to host and port pairs. One of the most notable capabilities is spoofed ident responses or ident spoofing.

The oidentd.conf configuration file can be used to specify the amount of control users have over the responses oidentd returns upon successful lookups for connections owned by them, while the $HOME/.oidentd.conf file allows a user to specify what ident response will be returned for specific connections.

See also
 Internet Relay Chat
 BNC (software)

References

External links
 Official website
 
 
 Original author's website
 
 

Linux authentication-related software
Linux network-related software
Internet software for Linux
BSD software